The Government of the Republic of South Ossetia is the political leadership of the only partially recognized, but de facto independent, Republic of South Ossetia.

Executive branch

South Ossetia's head of state is the president, the current president is Anatoly Bibilov. The head of government is the prime minister, who is supported by a cabinet of ministers. The current prime minister is Gennady Bekoyev.

In August, 2009, then-president Eduard Kokoity dismissed Aslanbek Bulatsev's cabinet. It was said that Bulatsev had long been sick and had repeatedly sought to resign. All ministers kept their posts for some time and work with new PM Vadim Brovtsev, though some were replaced after a while.

Current cabinet

(Cabinet 2014-2017) 

Source:

Abolished ministries
Per August 24, 2009, several ministries were abolished. The following ministries were merged into the new Ministry of Youth, Education and Science, which was to be headed by Kusraev:

The following ministries were abolished, their tasks being taken over by the Ministry of Economic Development:

Past ministers
Office: MINISTER OF JUSTICE

Legislative branch

The Parliament of South Ossetia is the parliament of the Republic of South Ossetia.

See also
Government of Georgia (country)
Politics of South Ossetia
Politics of Georgia (country)

External links
Ministry of Press and Mass Communications of the Republic of South Ossetia. Official site
 President of the Republic of South Ossetia. Official site

References

 
Politics of South Ossetia
Political organisations based in South Ossetia
South Ossetia